The Hochjoch (elevation 2,875 m, 9,432 ft) is a mountain pass in the Ötztal Alps on the border between Tyrol, Austria, and South Tyrol, Italy. Located between the Venter and Schnalser valleys, the Hochjoch is covered by the Hochjoch-Ferner glacier.

References

External links

Mountain passes of the Alps
Mountain passes of Tyrol (state)
Mountain passes of South Tyrol
Austria–Italy border crossings